Janusz Stanisław Krenz-Mikołajczak (30 March 1907 – 15 December 2002) was a Polish rower who competed in the 1932 Summer Olympics.

In 1932, he won the bronze medal with his partner Henryk Budziński in the coxless pair event. He was born in Poznań and died in Poznań.

References

External links
 profile 

1907 births
2002 deaths
Polish male rowers
Olympic rowers of Poland
Rowers at the 1932 Summer Olympics
Olympic bronze medalists for Poland
Olympic medalists in rowing
Sportspeople from Poznań
Medalists at the 1932 Summer Olympics
European Rowing Championships medalists